Jymmy Dougllas França (born 15 April 1984), known as just Jymmy, is a Brazilian footballer who plays for Paulista.

In Brazil, he played for clubs at Campeonato Carioca and Campeonato Capixaba. He also played at Campeonato Brasileiro Série C 2007 and Campeonato Brasileiro Série B 2008 before he moved to Slovakia in January 2009. Jymmy was signed by Sheriff Tiraspol in July 2009. On 4 August 2011, it was announced that Jymmy has joined Chornomorets on a six-month loan, with an option to buy at the end of loan.

Honous

Individual
Sheriff Tiraspol
Moldovan National Division Top scorer: 2009–10 (13 goals; joint with Alexandru Maximov)

References

External links

http://jymmyfut.blogspot.com/
http://jymmyfut.webnode.com.br/

1984 births
Living people
Brazilian footballers
Brazilian expatriate footballers
Estrela do Norte Futebol Clube players
Americano Futebol Clube players
Friburguense Atlético Clube players
América Futebol Clube (RN) players
Brazilian expatriate sportspeople in Moldova
FC Spartak Trnava players
FC Sheriff Tiraspol players
Moldovan Super Liga players
FC Chornomorets Odesa players
Slovak Super Liga players
Ukrainian Premier League players
Expatriate footballers in Slovakia
Brazilian expatriate sportspeople in Slovakia
Expatriate footballers in Moldova
Expatriate footballers in Ukraine
Brazilian expatriate sportspeople in Ukraine
Expatriate footballers in Japan
Brazilian expatriate sportspeople in Japan
J1 League players
J2 League players
Shimizu S-Pulse players
Tokyo Verdy players
Footballers from Rio de Janeiro (city)
Quissamã Futebol Clube players
Association football midfielders